Morden Road is a Tramlink stop in the London Borough of Merton. It is on the site of the former Morden Road railway station on the Wimbledon-West Croydon line, which closed to rail traffic in 1997. The tram stop consists of two platforms on either side of the double track, linked by pedestrian level crossings. Immediately to the east of the station is a single-track section which reaches as far as Phipps Bridge tram stop.

The eastbound platform is directly linked by ramp and stairway to Morden Road. A pedestrian entrance to the National Trust's Morden Hall Park is on Morden Road just to the south of the stop.

The stop is interlinked as an out of station interchange (OSI) with South Wimbledon on the London Underground's Northern line. The two stations are classed as an interchange for ticketing purposes but both managed separately.

Connections
London Buses routes 93, 470 and night route N155 serve the tram stop.

Future

A planned new line to the Tramlink light rail or a separate bus rapid transit (BRT) system called the Sutton Link will create a new tram or BRT with existing tram services for interchange with new platforms built at Morden Road somewhere close to the current tram stop, offering services to Sutton via St Helier or South Wimbledon via Morden Road.

Gallery

References

Tramlink stops in the London Borough of Merton
Railway stations in Great Britain opened in 2000